The Breaking of Bumbo is a 1970 British comedy film written and directed by Andrew Sinclair, a former Coldstream Guards National service officer that was updated from his 1959 novel of the same name that featured the Suez Crisis.  It starred Richard Warwick, Joanna Lumley, Jeremy Child and Edward Fox.

Plot
Newly commissioned Guards Ensign 'Bumbo' Bailey learns the facts of life from his new girl friend in Swinging London as well as from his platoon and commanding officer.

Cast

Production

In January 1970 Andrew Sinclair and Jeffrey Selznick announced they had formed a company, Timon Films, to make a film of Breaking of Bumbo in association with Associated British.

Kevin Brownlow and Andrew Mollo were going to direct but dropped out after a fall out with the producers.

Jacquemine Charrott Lodwidge was the film's fashion co-ordinator.

Reception
After a couple of preview screenings, the film's release was delayed then cancelled altogether. It was never distributed in Britain, but the producers recouped a little of their costs by selling the TV rights.

References

External links

1970 films
British comedy films
1970 comedy films
Films set in London
Guards Division (United Kingdom)
Military humor in film
EMI Films films
Films directed by Andrew Sinclair
1970s English-language films
1970s British films
Fictional soldiers